The Aydinids or Aydinid dynasty (Modern Turkish: Aydınoğulları, Aydınoğulları Beyliği), also known as the Principality of Aydin and Beylik of Aydin, was one of the Anatolian beyliks and famous for its seaborne raiding.

Name
It is named after its founder Aydın Mehmed Bey.

Capital
Its capital was at first in Birgi, and later in Ayasoluk (present day Selçuk), was one of the frontier principalities established in the 14th century by Oghuz Turks after the decline of Sultanate of Rûm.

History
The Aydinids also held parts of the port of Smyrna (modern İzmir) all through their rule and all of the port city with intervals. Especially during the reign of Umur Bey, the sons of Aydın were a significant naval power of the time. The naval power of Aydin played a crucial role in the Byzantine civil war of 1341–1347, where Umur allied with John VI Kantakouzenos, but also provoked a Latin response in the form of the Smyrniote crusades, that captured Smyrna from the beylik.

The Beylik was incorporated into the Ottoman Empire for the first time in 1390, and after the passage of Tamerlane in Anatolia in 1402 and the ensuing period of troubles that lasted until 1425, its territories became again part of the Ottoman realm, this time definitively.

Architecture
The Beys of Aydin left important architectural works, principally in Birgi and Ayasoluk (Selçuk), their capital cities.

Legacy
The city of Aydın (ancient Tralles) was named after the dynasty.

List of rulers
Muharizalsîn Gazi Mehmed Bey (1308–1334)
Umur Bey (1334–1348)
Khidr b. Mehmed (1348–1360)	
Isa b. Mehmed (1360–1390)

 Ottoman rule (1390–1402)

İsaoğlu Musa Bey (1402–1403)
Musaoğlu II. Umur Bey (1403–1405)	
İzmiroğlu Cüneyd Bey (1405–1426)

See also
 İsa Bey Mosque
 Anatolian beyliks
 Ottoman Empire
 List of Sunni Muslim dynasties
 Umur the Lion
 Cüneyt Bey of Aydın

References

Bibliography
 
 
 
 
 

 
History of İzmir Province
History of Aydın Province